Menn Krecke (20 December 1922 – 29 July 1976) was a Luxembourgian gymnast. He competed in eight events at the 1948 Summer Olympics.

References

1922 births
1976 deaths
Luxembourgian male artistic gymnasts
Olympic gymnasts of Luxembourg
Gymnasts at the 1948 Summer Olympics
Sportspeople from Luxembourg City
20th-century Luxembourgian people